Khairun Haled bin Masrom (born 4 June 1977) is a Malaysian former professional footballer.

Club career
Khairun played for Negeri Sembilan FA, Selangor FA, MPPJ FC, Perlis FA, Melaka TMFC and Johor FC. He was also a member of the Olympic 2000 team that played in the Malaysian League for the 1998 season.

National team
Khairun has played once for the Malaysia national football team.

He was in the Malaysia national under-21 football team that competes in the 1997 FIFA World Youth Championship, held in Malaysia. In the tournament, he scores an own goal in a 1-3 loss against Uruguay, and also was sent off in the game against Belgium as Malaysia exited the tournament in group stage having lost all 3 group games.

External links

References

1977 births
Living people
Malaysian footballers
Malaysia international footballers
Malaysian people of Malay descent
Association football defenders
Negeri Sembilan FA players